Olfactophilia or osmolagnia is a paraphilia for, or sexual arousal by, smells and odors emanating from the body, especially the sexual areas. Sigmund Freud  used the term osphresiolagnia in reference to pleasure caused by odors.

Campbell's Psychiatric Dictionary includes them into parosmias, disturbances of the sense of smell.

Etymology
 olfactophilia – Latin olfacto, to smell, pertaining to the sense of smell, and Greek philia, "love"
 osmolagnia – Greek osme, "smell", and lagneia, "lust"

See also
 Body odor
 Body odor and subconscious human sexual attraction
 List of paraphilias

Notes

Paraphilias
Sexual fetishism
Body odor